Luc Goiris (born 8 March 1968) is a Belgian former rower. He competed at the 1992 Summer Olympics, 1996 Summer Olympics and the 2000 Summer Olympics.

References

External links
 

1968 births
Living people
Belgian male rowers
Olympic rowers of Belgium
Rowers at the 1992 Summer Olympics
Rowers at the 1996 Summer Olympics
Rowers at the 2000 Summer Olympics
People from Bornem
Sportspeople from Antwerp Province